Haryanvi (  or  ), also known as Bangru, is an Indo-Aryan language spoken in the Indian state of Haryana, and in Pakistani districts of Pakpattan, Sahiwal, Okara, Bahawalpur and Multan within Punjab, Pakistan. Haryanvi is considered to be part of the dialect group of  Western Hindi, which also includes Khariboli and Braj. The Haryanvi language is written either in the Devanagari script in India, or with the Nastaliq variant of the Arabic script in Pakistan (just like with Urdu and Punjabi languages).

In popular culture
Bollywood films like Dangal, Sultan, and Tanu Weds Manu: Returns have used the Haryanvi culture and language as the backdrop of their films. These movies have received warm appreciation throughout India and abroad. As a result, some non-native speakers have shown an interest in learning the language.

Haryanvi has successfully made its presence count into Indian cinema, TV popular music albums & academia. With the influence of Haryana in the fields of sports, Bollywood, defense, industrialization & politics the Haryanvi language and culture has also been promoted in significant proportion. Some notable speakers of Haryanvi include the Phogat sisters, Vijender Singh, Sushil Kumar, Baba Ramdev, Dushyant Chautala, Randeep Hooda, Satish Kaushik.

The character Virendra Pratap Singh of the show Molkki (2020-present), played by Amar Upadhyay, speaks Haryanvi.

In Pakistan

After  Partition, 1.2 million Haryanvi-speaking Muslims migrated from Haryana and Delhi in India to Pakistan. Today in Pakistan, it is a "mother tongue" of millions of Muley Jat and Ranghar Muslims. They live in thousands of villages in Punjab, Pakistan, and hundreds of villages in Sindh and all over Pakistan. After the independence of Pakistan in 1947, many Uttar Pradesh Ranghars also migrated to Sindh in Pakistan and mostly settling in Karachi.

These people have settled down mainly in the districts of Lahore, Sheikhupura, Bhakkar, Bahawalnagar, Rahim yar Khan District (specially in Khanpur tehsil), Okara, Layyah, Vehari, Sahiwal, Phullarwan District Sargodha and Multan of Punjab. In districts of Pakpattan, Okara, and Bahawalnagar which have the densest concentrations of Rāngrri Speakers, they consist mostly of small peasants, with many serving in the army, police and Civil Services. They maintain an overarching tribal council (panchayat in the Rānghari language), which deals with a number of issues, such as punishments for petty crime or co-operation over village projects.
Haryanvi Speakers are also found in Mirpur Khas and Nawabshah Districts of Sindh.
Most Ranghar are now bilingual, speaking Urdu language as National. Punjabi, Saraiki and Sindhi as Regional, as well as still speaking Rāngrri language as "First Language" or "Mother Language" or "Village Language" or "Community language". 
A large number of Ranghars are also found in the capital city of Islamabad. They speak Urdu with Rāngrri accent.
Muley Jats, in addition, the Odh community in Pakistan also speak Rānghari as their mother tongue.

See also 

 Administrative divisions of Haryana
 Haryanvi cinema
 Haryanvi culture
 Haryanvi cultural tourism
 Haryanvi music
 Haryanvi people
 Haryanvi Raagni

References

Hindi languages
Haryana
Haryanavi culture
Haryanvi